Anna Trebunskaya (born 28 December 1980) is a Russian born American professional ballroom and Latin dancer, known for her appearances on Dancing with the Stars. She now lives in Los Angeles and dances in the International Latin style.

Personal life
Anna Trebunskaya was born December 28, 1980, in Chelyabinsk, Russia. Her parents, Oleg Trebunski and Irina Trebunskaya, owned a dance studio and were professional ballroom dancers. Having begun dancing at the age of six, their daughter entered and won her first competition when she was seven. She moved to the United States with her parents when she was 17 years old to pursue her career as a professional dancer.
She won her first US title of Amateur Standard Youth Championship in 1997 
later becoming a professional competitor in the year 2000.
Trebunskaya resides in California. She and her mother own a dance studio in Hermosa Beach, California.

In October 2012, after nine years of marriage, Trebunskaya and dancer Jonathan Roberts announced that they had separated and planned to divorce. Trebunskaya subsequently began a relationship with actor Nevin Millan. She gave birth to their daughter, Amalya Millan, on January 18, 2014. She gave birth to son Kaspyan on 2 September 2017.

Career

Professional ballroom competitions
In 2007, Trebunskaya and her partner Pavlo Barsuk took 6th place at the International Latin finals in America's Ballroom Challenge. Over the next several years, she continued to garner the attention of the ballroom community through a series of similar successes.

Dancing with the Stars
In Season 2, she partnered football star Jerry Rice, and together they came in 2nd to pop star Drew Lachey and Cheryl Burke. Trebunskaya and her husband Jonathan Roberts also performed together on results shows in its first three seasons. Trebunskaya returned to Dancing with the Stars for its fifth season and her celebrity partner was model Albert Reed. They were the second couple eliminated from the competition. Trebunskaya competed on Season 6 of Dancing with the Stars and her celebrity partner was actor Steve Guttenberg. She and Guttenberg were the third couple to be eliminated. In Season 9, her partner was UFC fighter Chuck Liddell. She and Liddell were the sixth couple to be eliminated. In Season 10, she competed with US Olympic Figure Skating Gold Medalist Evan Lysacek. They finished in 2nd place to pop star Nicole Scherzinger and Derek Hough.
In Season 11, Trebunskaya was partnered with football quarterback Kurt Warner. They placed 5th overall and were the 8th couple eliminated.
For the twelfth season, Trebunskaya was partnered with boxing legend, Sugar Ray Leonard. They were the third couple eliminated. For the thirteenth season, Trebunskaya was partnered with fashion guru Carson Kressley. They were the fifth couple eliminated. In season 14, she was  partnered with soap opera star Jack Wagner. They were the second couple eliminated from the competition. For season 15, she was partnered with season 2 winner Drew Lachey, they were eliminated in week 3 of competition on a double elimination week.

On September 2, 2015, Trebunskaya was announced as returning pro for season 21 after a 5-season hiatus. She was paired with actor Gary Busey. They were eliminated on Week 4 and finished in 10th place.

Performances

With Jerry Rice
Average: 23.09

With Albert Reed
Average: 21.0

With Steve Guttenberg
Average: 18.3

With Chuck Liddell
Average: 17.25

Score was awarded by stand in judge Baz Luhrmann

With Evan Lysacek
Average: 26.3

For week 4 there was a technical and performance score.

With Kurt Warner
Average: 21.63

For Week 4 there were scores for both Technique and Performance

With Sugar Ray Leonard
Average: 18.75

With Carson Kressley
Average: 19.4

With Jack Wagner
Average: 22.6

With Drew Lachey
Average: 22.7

With Gary Busey
Average: 16.4

1Score given by guest judge Alfonso Ribeiro.

Achievements
with Pavlo Barsuk
 2008 U.S. National Professional Latin Finalist, 3rd place (Professional Latin)
 2008 Open to the world U.S Open Latin Finalist
 2008 Blackpool Rising Star Latin Finalist
 2008 UK Rising Star Latin Finalist, 2nd place ( Professional Latin)
 2008 International Grand Ball Latin Champion
 2007 U.S National Professional Latin Finalist

with Jonathan Roberts
 2004 USA Rising Star Latin Champions
 2003 Blackpool Rising Star Latin Finalist

with Vitali Koulik
 1998 U.S. National Amateur Youth Ballroom Champion and Representative to the World

Film & TV appearances
The Newsroom - Season 3, Episode 5 (airport ticket agent)

References

External links
 http://www.annatrebunskayadancer.com 

1980 births
Living people
American ballroom dancers
Russian emigrants to the United States
Russian ballroom dancers
People from Chelyabinsk
Participants in American reality television series
21st-century Russian dancers
21st-century American dancers